The Dalvi is an Indian surname derived from the name of a clan found among the Saraswat Brahmin, Maratha, Koli and Pathare Prabhu communities of Maharashtra.

People with the name
 John Dalvi (1920–1974), Indian Army officer
 Datta Dalvi, Indian politician
 Jaywant Dalvi (1925–1994), Indian Marathi-language writer
 Jaswantarao Dalvi, ruler of Palval, a small principality under the Sultanates of Deccan (1662) 
 Madhav Dalvi (1925–2012), Indian cricketer
 Michael Dalvi (born 1945), Indian cricketer, son of John Dalvi
 Shireen Dalvi, Indian journalist
 Sudhir Dalvi (born 1939), Indian actor
 Tushar Dalvi, Indian actor

References

Surnames
Maratha clans